Tango is a 1936 American drama film directed by Phil Rosen and starring Marian Nixon, Chick Chandler and Marie Prevost.

Premise
After her husband leaves her, a woman takes up a career as a tango dancer.

Cast
 Marian Nixon as Treasure McGuire  
 Chick Chandler as Oliver Huston 
 Marie Prevost as Betty Barlow, Treasure's Roommate  
 Matty Kemp as Anthony Thorne aka 'Tony' Carver  
 Warren Hymer as Joe Sloan, Betty's Boyfriend  
 Herman Bing as Mr. Kluckmeyer, Tango Hosiery  
 George Meeker as Foster Carver, Tony's Brother  
 Virginia Howell as Mrs. Carver, Tony's Mother  
 Franklin Pangborn as Oscar the Photographer 
 Kathryn Sheldon as Mrs. Alman the Landlady

References

Bibliography
 Michael R. Pitts. Poverty Row Studios, 1929–1940: An Illustrated History of 55 Independent Film Companies, with a Filmography for Each. McFarland & Company, 2005.

External links
 

1936 films
1936 drama films
American drama films
Films directed by Phil Rosen
Chesterfield Pictures films
American black-and-white films
1930s English-language films
1930s American films